Kaltenkirchen is a rapid transit station on the Hamburg-Altona–Neumünster railway line, located some  north of Hamburg, in the center of Kaltenkirchen, a town in the German state of Schleswig-Holstein.

History 

Originally opened in 1884 and rebuilt in 2004, Kaltenkirchen is an integral part of AKN commuter rail, serving the Hamburg Metropolitan Region's North-west.

Service 
Kaltenkirchen is served by AKN Eisenbahn lines A1 and A2.

See also  

 Hamburger Verkehrsverbund (HVV)
 List of railway stations in Schleswig-Holstein

References

External links 

 Line and route network plans by hvv.de 
 Line and route network plans by akn.de 

Railway stations in Schleswig-Holstein
Railway stations in Germany opened in 1884